Tero Puha (born 1971) is a Finnish visual artist, photographer and filmmaker. His work often studies and explores the body image, identities and consumerism in the modern world. He is known for his aesthetic body studies as well as performances and video art. Puha has worked in the last few years mainly outside Finland (London, Paris and Berlin).

His works are included in the collections of the Museum of Contemporary Art Kiasma, Helsinki City Art Museum, Finnish Museum of Photography, Brandts Museum of Photographic Art and Kiyosato Museum of Photographic Arts in Japan).

Puha's first retrospective book Almost Human-Works 1995-2010 (Inky Robot Media]) was published in 2011. The publication includes over 200 illustrations and texts by five Finnish Art experts: Leevi Haapala, Leena-Maija Rossi, Annamari Vänskä, Livia Hekanaho and Anna-Kaisa Rastenberger (Finnish Museum of Photography).

Puha was awarded the Finnish State Prize in Photographic Arts in 2014.

References

Finnish photographers
Finnish filmmakers
1971 births
Living people
Finnish performance artists